The Men's Discus Throw F33-34/52 had its Final held on September 8 at 17:00.

Medalists

Results

References
Final

Athletics at the 2008 Summer Paralympics